Aeridostachya is a genus of orchids.

Species
, Plants of the World Online accepts the following species:
Aeridostachya acuminata (Blume) Rauschert
Aeridostachya clavimentalis (Ridl.) Rauschert
Aeridostachya coffeicolor (Kraenzl.) Rauschert
Aeridostachya crassipes (Ridl.) Rauschert
Aeridostachya dasystachys (Ridl.) Rauschert
Aeridostachya decurrentipetala (J.J.Sm.) Rauschert
Aeridostachya dulitensis (Carr) Schuit., Y.P.Ng & H.A.Pedersen
Aeridostachya feddeana (Schltr.) Brieger
Aeridostachya gobiensis (Schltr.) Rauschert
Aeridostachya junghuhnii (J.J.Sm.) Brieger
Aeridostachya macrophylla (Ames & C.Schweinf.) J.J.Wood
Aeridostachya mearnsii (Leav.) Rauschert
Aeridostachya odontoglossa (Schltr.) Rauschert
Aeridostachya ovilis (J.J.Sm.) Rauschert
Aeridostachya propinqua (Ames) W.Suarez & Cootes
Aeridostachya robusta (Blume) Brieger
Aeridostachya sumatrensis (Ridl.) Rauschert
Aeridostachya trichotaenia (Schltr.) Brieger
Aeridostachya unifolia (J.J.Sm.) Rauschert
Aeridostachya vulcanica (Schltr.) Brieger

References

Podochileae genera